Katův šleh (literally executioner’s whipping) is a Czech dish being served in most conventional restaurants. It is a low-cost meal which can be easily and quickly prepared. It is made in many variants, however, the necessary attribute is a strong pungency or piquancy and the presence of pork or chicken meat cut into thin strips (referred to as “noodles” in Czech).

Composition

strips of chicken or pork (can be mixed together)
onion
chilli pepper
hot paprika
sweet paprika
tomato sauce
pickles
black pepper powder
worcestershire sauce

Preparation
Meat is fried in a pan and later is steamed with ingredients. Can be served with rice, cooked potatoes or French fries.

Naming
A name of Katův šleh is also very variable, though the name always refers to its piquance. Names of Čertovo tajemství (Demon's Secret) or Pekelné nudličky (Hellish meat noodles) are also used from time to time.

References

Czech cuisine